James Francis Goddard (born 30 March 1983) is a Seychelles-born British competitive swimmer and backstroker who represented Great Britain in the Olympics, FINA world championships and European championships, and swam for England in the Commonwealth Games.

Personal life
Goddard was born in the Seychelles and lived in Beau Vallon, but moved to Stockport, England, during his youth, and attended Werneth School, and trains in Stockport with other swimmers such as Keri-Anne Payne and Michael Rock. James Goddard is an Olympic swimmer in backstroke and medley

Career
Goddard represented Great Britain at the 2004 Summer Olympics in Athens, where he finished 4th in the 200m backstroke.  Goddard also represented Great Britain at the 2008 Summer Olympics in the 200 m individual medley swimming events.  At the 2012 Summer Olympics, he only competed in the men's 200 m individual medley, finishing in 7th.

Goddard represented England in the 2002 Commonwealth Games, where he won a gold in the men's 200 m backstroke and a bronze in the men's 200m individual medley, at the 2006 Commonwealth Games, and at the 2010 Commonwealth Games, where he again won a gold in the men's 200m backstroke and this time gold in the men's 200m individual medley.

Personal bests and records held

See also
 List of Commonwealth Games medallists in swimming (men)

References

External links
British Olympic Association athlete profile
British Swimming athlete profile
Social Media Profile

1983 births
British male medley swimmers
British male backstroke swimmers
English male swimmers
Olympic swimmers of Great Britain
Commonwealth Games gold medallists for England
Commonwealth Games bronze medallists for England
Swimmers at the 2002 Commonwealth Games
Swimmers at the 2006 Commonwealth Games
Swimmers at the 2010 Commonwealth Games
Swimmers at the 2004 Summer Olympics
Swimmers at the 2008 Summer Olympics
Swimmers at the 2012 Summer Olympics
Living people
Medalists at the FINA World Swimming Championships (25 m)
European Aquatics Championships medalists in swimming
Commonwealth Games medallists in swimming
Seychellois emigrants to the United Kingdom
Seychellois male swimmers
Sportspeople from Stockport
Medallists at the 2002 Commonwealth Games
Medallists at the 2010 Commonwealth Games